Priit Narusk (born 8 December 1977, in Võru) is a retired Estonian cross-country skier. He represented Estonia at the 2002 Winter Olympics in Salt Lake City, and at the 2006 Winter Olympics in Turin.

References

External links

1977 births
Living people
Estonian male cross-country skiers
Cross-country skiers at the 2002 Winter Olympics
Cross-country skiers at the 2006 Winter Olympics
Olympic cross-country skiers of Estonia
Sportspeople from Võru
21st-century Estonian people